Fear Flaith Ó Gnímh (c. 1540 – c. 1630) was an early modern Irish poet.
 
Little is known for certain of Ó Gnímh. He was born in Ulster, and his family located near Larne, County Antrim. His best known poem is "A Niocláis, nocht an gcláirsigh!" He was known as O'Gnive in English, and was the bard of the O'Neill of Clannaboy.

References
"Éireannaigh féin fionnLochlannaigh", Dioghluim Dána, ed. Lambert McKenna, Dublin, 1938, pp. 290–293
"Tairnig éigse fhuinn Gaoidheal", Dioghluim Dána, ed. Lambert McKenna, Dublin, 1938, pp. 398–399
"A Niocláis, nocht an gcláirsigh!", Irish Bardic Poetry, ed. Osborn Bergin, Dublin, 1970, pp. 112–114
"Beannacht ar anmain Éireann", Irish Bardic Poetry, ed. Osborn Bergin, Dublin, 1970, pp. 115–117
"A dhuine chuirios an crann", Irish Bardic Poetry, ed. Osborn Bergin, Dublin, 1970, 118-119
"Mairg do-chuaidh re ceird ndúthchais", Irish Bardic Poetry, ed. Osborn Bergin, Dublin, 1970, pp. 120–123
Irish Verse: An Anthology, ed. Bob Blaisdell, 2002, pp. 26–29

External links
http://www.ucc.ie/celt/itbardic.html#flathaognimh
http://www.standingstones.com/harppoem2.html

Irish poets
17th-century Irish writers
Irish-language poets
16th-century Irish poets
17th-century Irish poets
People from County Antrim
People of Elizabethan Ireland
1540s births
1630s deaths